Aorta Ridge is a ridge that separates upper Miers Glacier from Adams Glacier and extends eastward to Holiday Peak in the Denton Hills, Scott Coast, Antarctica. The name was approved by the New Zealand Geographic Board in 1994; it derives from association with “The Heart,” an informal name used in the 1960s for Holiday Peak.

References
 

Ridges of Victoria Land
Scott Coast